Lauro Lines s.r.l. v. Chasser, 490 U.S. 495 (1989), is the touchstone case in which the United States Supreme Court laid out the law of interlocutory appeals for United States federal courts.

Facts
Plaintiff cruise passengers had filed a lawsuit in a United States district court against the defendant cruise line for injuries sustained when an Italian cruise ship, the Achille Lauro, was hijacked by terrorists. The cruise ticket included a forum selection clause which required that lawsuits against the cruise line be brought in Naples, Italy.

The cruise line filed a motion to dismiss for lack of personal jurisdiction, based on the forum selection clause. The district court denied the motion, and the cruise line sought an interlocutory appeal of this motion. The appellate court denied the motion based on the final judgment rule, 28 U.S.C. 1291, asserting that the cruise line would have to wait until the case was decided before filing any appeals. This ruling was immediately appealed to the U.S. Supreme Court, which granted certiorari.

Issue
The Supreme Court was asked to decide whether a party can bring an interlocutory appeal against dismissal of a motion for lack of personal jurisdiction based on the existence of a forum selection clause.

Opinion of the Court
The defendants argued that this fell under the judge-made collateral order doctrine, which allows immediate appeals of rulings that are collateral to the merits of the case, would determine it conclusively, and would not be effectively reviewable unless an immediate appeal were allowed.  This doctrine was originally established in Cohen v. Beneficial Industrial Loan Corp., 337 U.S. 541 (1949).

The Court, in a unanimous opinion by Justice Brennan, held that the collateral order doctrine does not apply to a forum selection clause. This was not a case where the defendant was claiming a right not to be tried at all, like a sovereign immunity case, which would be disposed of before the defendant was even subject to the discovery process. Instead, the defendant was acknowledging that it could be sued, but merely disputing the appropriate forum for the suit.

Justice Scalia, concurring, wrote to express his opinion that the reason an interlocutory appeal would not stand in this case was that "the law does not deem the right important enough to be vindicated" by an interlocutory appeal.

See also
 List of United States Supreme Court cases, volume 490
 List of United States Supreme Court cases
 Lists of United States Supreme Court cases by volume
 List of United States Supreme Court cases by the Rehnquist Court

References

External links

United States civil procedure case law
United States forum selection case law
United States Supreme Court cases
United States Supreme Court cases of the Rehnquist Court
1989 in United States case law
MS Achille Lauro
Italy–United States relations